Andrea Pasqualino Marini (c. 1660 - after 1712) was an Italian painter active in the Marche region in a late-Baroque style.

Biography
He was born in Recanati, in the province of Macerata. He appears to have trained in Rome, either under Carlo Maratta or one of his pupils.  In Rome, he also helped decorate Sant'Andrea delle Fratte with frescoes. Later in life, he returned to Recanati. In 1697 he painted a processional standard for the Confraternity of the Crucifix in Foligno. He painted an altarpiece depicting  San Carlo Borromeo for the church of San Filippo Neri, Recanati. He painted a Mystical Marriage of St Catherine for the church of Santa Maria di Castelnuovo in Recanati.

References

1660s births
1710s deaths
People from Recanati
17th-century Italian painters
Italian male painters
18th-century Italian painters
Italian Baroque painters
18th-century Italian male artists